Just a Little Harmless Sex is a 1999 American romantic sex comedy film which revolves around a stranded motorist (and prostitute)'s offer to perform oral sex on a monogamous man who stops to help her. The unlikely good Samaritan must telephone his wife to bail him out in the middle of the night upon his arrest for the encounter. She throws him out of the house just a few days later and goes out with her friends to enjoy a sexy night on the town. The denouement takes place when all the parties meet at a local nightclub for explanations and apologies. The film was directed by Rick Rosenthal, written by Roger Mills and Marti Noxon, and stars Alison Eastwood and Jonathan Silverman.

The film received generally poor reviews from critics, with a Rotten Tomatoes rating of 20% derived from five professional reviews. Writing for The New York Times, Lawrence Van Gelder compared the film to a TV sitcom, and said the movie was "well cast, well acted and thoroughly inconsequential". Writing for Variety, Lael Loewenstein said "what saves [the film] from being utterly predictable is its zesty dialogue".

References

External links
 
 

1999 films
1999 independent films
1999 romantic comedy films
American romantic comedy films
American teen romance films
1990s English-language films
American sex comedy films
American independent films
Films directed by Rick Rosenthal
Films with screenplays by Marti Noxon
1990s sex comedy films
1990s American films